Manasy Veetinal (born 28 March), screen name Manasy,  is an Indian actress who works in Malayalam films. She has won the P. A. Backer Foundation Award for Best Debutant Actress for her role in the 2012 Malayalam language film Pratheekshayode that deals with the challenges of child labour.

Biography
Manasy was born and brought up in Bahrain to a Christian Malayali family that originally hails from Mavelikara, Kerala. She attended the Indian School, Bahrain and pursued a Bachelor's degree in Videography and Mass Communication at  Mar Ivanios College, Thriuvananthpuram under the University of Kerala. During her school years, she won accolades in acting, dancing and other performance arts including award for Best Actress at the age of fourteen in the BKS Drama Festival 2004-05, in which she played the female lead in a drama based on Vaikom Muhammad Basheer's Poovan Pazham. She also had a stint as an anchor on a Jeevan TV Sponsored Program produced and recorded from Bahrain.

Filmography

References

External links
 

Living people
Indian Christians
Indian film actresses
People from Manama
Indian expatriates in Bahrain
Actresses in Malayalam cinema
Actresses from Thiruvananthapuram
21st-century Indian actresses
Year of birth missing (living people)